Krasnoye is a rural locality (a settlement) in Dobryansky District, Perm Krai, Russia. The population was 36 as of 2010. There are 4 streets.

References 

Rural localities in Dobryansky District